Alternating caps, also known as studly caps or sticky caps (where "caps" is short for capital letters), is a form of text notation in which the capitalization of letters varies by some pattern, or arbitrarily (often also omitting spaces between words and occasionally some letters), such as "aLtErNaTiNg cApS", "sTuDlY cApS" or "sTiCKycApS".

History 
According to the Jargon File, the origin and significance of the practice is obscure. The term "alternating case" has been used as early as the 1970s, in several studies on word identification.

Arbitrary variation found popularity among adolescent users during the BBS and early WWW eras of online culture, as if in parody of the marginally less idiosyncratic capitalization found in common trade and service marks of the time. This method was extensively used since the 1980s in the BBS-world and warez scene (for example in FILE_ID.DIZ and .nfo files) to show "elite" (or elitist) attitude, the often used variant was using small-caps vowels and capitalised consonants ("THiS iS aN eXCePTioNaLLy eLiTe SeNTeNCe.") or reversed capitals ("eXTENDED kEY gENERERATOR pRO").
The iNiQUiTY BBS software based on Renegade had a feature to support two variants of this automatically: either all vowels would be uppercase or all vowels would be lowercase, with the consonants as the other case.

A meme known as "Mocking SpongeBob" popularized using alternating caps to convey a mocking tone starting in May 2017, leading to alternating caps becoming a mainstream method of conveying mockery in text.

Usage and effect 

Alternating caps are typically used to display mockery in text messages.

The randomized capitalization leads to the flow of words being broken, making it harder for the text to be read as it disrupts word identification even when the size of the letters is the same as in uppercase or lowercase.

Unlike the use of all-lowercase letters, which suggests efficiency as a motivation, alternating caps requires additional effort to type, either by holding and releasing the shift key with one hand while hunting-and-pecking, by intermittently pressing one shift key or the other while touch typing, or by using an online tool to convert existing text.

See also 
 Camel case
 All caps

Notes

References 

Capitalization
Internet culture
Orthography